Zumba Fitness 2 is the second video game in the installment of the Fitness series, based on the Zumba program. It is also the sequel to Zumba Fitness (2010), later followed by Zumba Fitness Core (2012). Developed by Zoë Mode, it was published by Majesco Entertainment. It was released first on the Wii in November 2011 and then on Kinect for Xbox 360 in February 2012 under the title Zumba Fitness Rush.

Gameplay
Players can learn and perfect nine different dance styles: reggaeton, merengue, salsa, cumbia, hip hop, mambo, rumba, flamenco and calypso as well as new routines including the axé, Indian, Latin pop, bellydance and pasodoble. led by Zumba creator Beto and celebrity instructors Gina Grant and Tanya Beardsley. New features include a calorie tracker, revamped gameplay and graphical representations of the instructors.

Soundtrack
The game uses licensed tracks for its soundtrack, which includes "Pause" by Pitbull as the game's theme song. Other songs for the game include a Zumba version of "Poison" by Nicole Scherzinger, and "We No Speak Americano" by Yolanda Be Cool & DCUP.

"Pause" is featured uncut on the Wii version, with the Kinect version using the edited "Zumba Mix" of the track.

Reception
The Xbox 360 version received mainly unfavorable reviews, most notably due to the lack of online multiplayer from Zumba Fitness.

References

2011 video games
Dance video games
Fitness games
Kinect games
Majesco Entertainment games
Music video games
Video game sequels
Wii games
Xbox 360 games
Multiplayer and single-player video games
Video games developed in the United Kingdom
Zoë Mode games